Stanisław Nowak (11 July 1935 – 12 December 2021) was a Polish Roman Catholic prelate. He was archbishop of Częstochowa from 1984 to 2011.

References

1935 births
2021 deaths
20th-century Roman Catholic archbishops in Poland
21st-century Roman Catholic archbishops in Poland
People from Kraków County
People from Częstochowa